Ryun may refer to the following people:
Given name
Ryun Williams (born 1969), American basketball coach

Surname
Jim Ryun (born 1947), American politician and track and field athlete 
Ned Ryun (born 1973), American political activist

See also
Cha Ye-ryun (born 1985), South Korean actress
Jo Hye-ryun (born 1970), South Korean comedian
Park Hye-ryun, South Korean screenwriter